The Great Britain national under-21 speedway team is the national under-21 motorcycle speedway team of Great Britain and is controlled by the Auto-Cycle Union. The team was started in all editions of Under-21 World Cup and was won one silver medal in 2007. Denmark has produced three Under-21 World Champions: Chris Louis (1990), Joe Screen (1993) and Lee Richardson (1999). Two riders, Marvyn Cox (1984) and Gary Havelock (1987) was won Individual U-21 European Championship open for riders from all continents.

Competition

See also 
 Great Britain national speedway team

External links 
 (de) Deutscher Motor Sport Bund webside

National speedway teams
S
Team